Lar is a town, a nagar panchayat, and is a block headquarter in Deoria district in the Indian state of Uttar Pradesh. It belongs to the Gorakhpur Division and is located 45 KM toward the south from District headquarter Deoria. Lar is noted by a single, old and historical, bazaar i.e., a business centre, in the town; it lies at a short distance 3.2 KM toward east of the nearest railway station Lar Road. In addition, the business centre, 5-8 KM toward the east within Lar block, is connected with many villages that exist on the western bank of river Chhoti Gandak or riverbanks partly surrounded by Chhoti Gandak and Ghaghara.

Demographics

 India census: Lar had a population of 25,492; Males constitute 51% of the population and females 49%; Lar has an average literacy rate of 69%, lower than the national average of 74.04%; male literacy is 70%, and female literacy is 55% and; in Lar, 17% of the population is under 6 years of age.

Education
Lar has many colleges, several school, and some madrasa. Notably, these include: Swami Devanand Post Graduate College Math Lar Deoria, B.S.P.G college Pindi, O.K.M Inter college, S.Z.M.P high school, S.D Inter college, Ayesha Rashid Girls High school, an old government Junior High School, and DarulUloom Mohammadia Ramnagar.

See also
Maqbool Ahmed Lari, Indian social worker and Urdu writer
Iraqi Biradari, Indian Muslim community from Lar

References

External links
 

Cities and towns in Deoria district